"Night of Fear" is the debut single by British rock band the Move, written by Roy Wood. The song was first released on 9 December 1966, and reached number 2 in the UK Singles Chart on 26 January 1967, staying for ten weeks in the charts. "Night of Fear" was the first of a string of four consecutive top-five singles in the UK.

Background 
By this point in time, Roy Wood had only written two songs, One of which was a B-side titled "Make Them Understand", which he had recorded with Mike Sheridan's Lot in September 1965 (a band which would eventually turn into The Idle Race). The other was "You're the One I Need", which was recorded by the Move in January 1966, however, that recording remained unreleased for several years. Their manager, Tony Secunda, had also started encouraging Wood to start writing more material, including tracks for a debut single. He started composing, and eventually, through the use of musical quotation, came up with two tracks, "Night of Fear" and "Disturbance". The main riff and the bass line in the chorus is derived from Pyotr Ilyich Tchaikovsky's 1812 Overture.

At one point, Wood wanted the single's B-side "Disturbance" to be the Move's first A-side, but "Night of Fear" was eventually chosen as it was deemed to be more commercial. Despite being an upbeat tune, the lyrics of "Night of Fear" revolve around supernatural occurrences, such as moving shadows in a hallway, along with shifting pictures in a bedroom and as such, the lyrics allude to the narrator being on an hallucinogenic substance, most likely LSD or Cannabis. "Disturbance" on the other hand, bases its lyrics on the psychologically disturbed mind of the narrator. The song features all four of the Move's vocalists: Carl Wayne, Trevor Burton, Ace Kefford and Roy Wood in four-part harmony, primarily featuring Wayne and Wood with Kefford singing the chorus "Just about to flip your mind, just about to trip your mind".

Recording and release 
"Night of Fear" was first introduced to an audience on 21 October 1966, during a performance in Croydon, South London. The reception for the song was positive, and the Move entered Advision Studios and recorded the song the following day, on 22 October. The single was released by Deram Records on 9 December 1966 with the catalogue number DM.109. The single was a large success in the UK, where it entered the charts on 11 January 1967 at a position of 32. Three weeks later, on 1 February, it peaked at number 2, a position it held for one week. The single exited the top-10 on 1 March and was last seen on 15 March at a position of 46, after which it dropped off. In total, the single spent 10 weeks on the chart, half of which were in the top-10. "Night of Fear" was also a large success in continental Europe and New Zealand. As with all singles by the Move, it did not chart on Billboard Hot 100.

The song was notably promoted, when during a visit to Manchester, they attempted to get arrested for walking around with a false H-bomb, in a stunt that was promoted by Secunda. Reviews for the song were positive. One article read "Meet the pioneers of the psychedelic sound", and as a result of its trippy sound, rumours started circulating that the word "Psychedelic" was a synonym for LSD, and that the group were using it, something later debunked by drummer Bev Bevan: "Nobody believed that Roy wasn't out of his head on drugs - but he wasn't. It was all fairy stories rooted in childhood."

Personnel 
The Move
 Carl Wayne – lead, harmony and backing vocals
 Trevor Burton – rhythm guitar, harmony and backing vocals
 Ace Kefford – bass guitar, lead (chorus), harmony and backing vocals
 Roy Wood – lead guitar, harmony and backing vocals
 Bev Bevan – drums

Additional personnel
 Denny Cordell – studio engineer, producer
 Gerald Chevin – studio engineer

Charts

Notes

References

The Move songs
1966 debut singles
Songs written by Roy Wood
Deram Records singles
Song recordings produced by Denny Cordell
1966 songs
Songs about drugs
British psychedelic rock songs